Rachel Parker Muñoz (born November 24, 1986) is a Republican politician from Maryland. Following the resignation of State Delegate Michael E. Malone to serve as a state circuit court judge, Governor Larry Hogan appointed her to serve the remainder of his term. Since 2021, she has served in the Maryland House of Delegates, representing district 33, based in Anne Arundel County. Muñoz has filed to run in the 2022 election.

Early life
Rachel Parker Muñoz attended Severna Park High School. She graduated from the University of Maryland, College Park with a Bachelor of Arts in 2009. She then graduated from  the University of Maryland Francis King Carey School of Law in 2021 with a J.D.

Career
Muñoz served as a law clerk at Simons & Campbell in 2019. She served as the editor of the Maryland Journal of Internal Law from 2019 to 2021. She became a law clerk at Schulte Booth PC in 2021.

She was appointed on November 8, 2021, to serve the remainder of Michael E. Malone's term in the Maryland House of Delegates, representing district 33.

Personal life
Muñoz is married and has four children.

References and notes

Living people
1986 births
University of Maryland, College Park alumni
University of Maryland Francis King Carey School of Law alumni
Republican Party members of the Maryland House of Delegates
Hispanic and Latino American state legislators in Maryland
Hispanic and Latino American women in politics
21st-century American politicians
21st-century American women politicians